Ptychobela is a genus of sea snails, marine gastropod mollusks in the family Pseudomelatomidae.

Species
Species within the genus Ptychobela include:
 Ptychobela baynhami (Smith E. A., 1891)
 Ptychobela dancei Kilburn & Dekker, 2008
 Ptychobela griffithii (Gray, 1834)
 Ptychobela lanceolata (Reeve, 1845)
 Ptychobela lavinia (Dall, 1919)
 Ptychobela minimarus (Kosuge, 1993) 
 Ptychobela nodulosa (Gmelin, 1791)
 Ptychobela opisthochetos Kilburn, 1989
 Ptychobela resticula Li B. Q., Kilburn & Li X. Z., 2010
 Ptychobela salebra Li & Li, 2007
 Ptychobela schoedei Thiele, 1925
 Ptychobela sumatrensis (Petit de la Saussaye, 1852)
 Ptychobela superba Thiele, 1925
 Ptychobela suturalis (Gray, 1838)
 Ptychobela vexillium (Habe & Kosuge, 1966) 
 Ptychobela zebra Chang, C.K. & W.L. Wu, 2000
Species brought into synonymy
 Ptychobela crenularis (Lamarck, 1816): synonym of Ptychobela nodulosa (Gmelin, 1791)
 Ptychobela flavidula (Lamarck, 1822): synonym of Clathrodrillia flavidula (Lamarck, 1822)
 Ptychobela kawamurai (Habe, T. & S. Kosuge, 1966): synonym of Cheungbeia kawamurai (Habe, T. & S. Kosuge, 1966)
 Ptychobela pseudoprincipalis Yokoyama, 1920 : synonym of Inquisitor pseudoprincipalis (Yokoyama, 1920)
 Ptychobela subochracea Springsteen and Leobrera 1986: synonym of Aguilaria subochracea (Smith, 1877)
 Ptychobela takeokaensis (Otuka, 1949): synonym of Crassispira takeokensis (Otuka, 1949)

References

 Thiele, J. 1925. Gastropoda der Deutschen Tiefsee-Expedition. II. Teil. pp. in Chun, C. Wissenschaftliche Ergebnisse der Deutschen Tiefsee-Expedition auf dem Damfper "Valdivia" 1898–1899. Jena : Gustav Fischer Vol. 17(2) 348 pp., 34 pls.
 Kilburn, R. N., 1989 [November], Notes on Ptychobela and Brachytoma, with the description of a new species from Mozambique (Mollusca: Gastropoda: Turridae). Annals of the Natal Museum, 30: 185–196.

External links
 
 Bouchet, P.; Kantor, Y. I.; Sysoev, A.; Puillandre, N. (2011). A new operational classification of the Conoidea (Gastropoda). Journal of Molluscan Studies. 77(3): 273-308
 Worldwide Mollusc Species Data Base: Pseudomelatomidae

 
Pseudomelatomidae
Gastropod genera